Yanqihu railway station, formerly known as Fangezhuang railway station before 2019, is a railway station in Fangezhuang Village, Yanqi Subdistrict, Huairou District, Beijing. It was built in 1976 and was renamed to the current name on July 15, 2019.

The station currently serves passenger transportation, baggage and parcel consignment, and freight (including handling of complete vehicles and LTL cargo).

See also 
 Huairou–Miyun line
 Beijing–Baotou railway
 Beijing North railway station

References 

Railway stations in China opened in the 1970s